Shah was the name of several currencies used in Ukraine. The name derives from shilling via .

17th-19th centuries 
Ukrainian-speakers used the term shah to refer to the Polish–Lithuanian Commonwealth's silver coin of 17th-18th centuries with face value of 3 grosz, coined from 1528, and especially during the times of Sigismund III Vasa (ruled Poland–Lithuania from 1587 to 1632). Later, when the Ukrainian lands came increasingly under the influence of Russia, the name was transferred to the Russian copper coin of 2 kopecks. From 1839, when the Russian Empire extended its silver coinage, the term shah was transferred to the silver ½-kopeck. This term for the kopeck remained in use until 1917.

Early 20th century 
In 1917, banknotes were introduced in the newly independent Ukraine. These were denominated in shah, hryvnia and karbovanets, with 100 shahiv = 1 hryvnia and 2 hryvni = 1 karbovanets.

At the beginning of the 20th century, during World War I (1914–1918), many countries issued currency in the form of stamps. It was done similarly in early independent Ukrainian states: in West Ukrainian National Republic and Ukrainian People's Republic. There, these money stamps were called  (singular:). Stamps in denominations of 10, 20, 30, 40, and 50 shahiv were issued.

These shahivki were printed on perforated 11 ½ card stock, due to a shortage of metals needed for the war effort at the time. Each currency stamp was inscribed on the reverse with a tryzub (trident) and with some words stating that these shahivki circulate in lieu of coins and that they are prohibited to be used as stamps. However, they do appear on some postal envelopes as there was an acute deficiency of "true" stamps. Nevertheless, on July 18, 1918, the independent Ukrainian government authorized its first set of stamp issues, also called shahivki and having nearly identical designs.

The 10 and 20-shah stamps issues of Ukrainian People's Republic were designed by the artist Anton Sereda and the 30, 40, and 50-shah stamps by Heorhiy Narbut, a master graphic artist and president of the Ukrainian Academy of Arts in Kyiv.

Late 20th century 
In 1992, after the dissolution of the Soviet Union after which the newly independent Ukraine was able to choose its own currency, trial runs of coins of 1 shah and 50 shahiv were issued, but were not approved.

See also 

Postage stamps and postal history of Ukraine
Ukrainian hryvnia, the national currency of Ukraine since 1996
Ukrainian karbovanets, currency of Ukraine during three separate periods
Economy of Ukraine

References

External links 

 Chernoivanenko, Vitaliy. History of paper money in Ukraine (1917–1920) in Zerkalo Nedeli, September 22–28, 2001. Available in Russian and Ukrainian
 History of Ukrainian money in Zerkalo Nedeli, September 2–8, 2006. Available in Russian and Ukrainian

Economic history of Ukraine
Modern obsolete currencies
Currencies of Ukraine
Philately of Ukraine
Postage stamps of Ukraine